Tyana falcata is a species of moth of the family Nolidae first described by Francis Walker in 1866. It is found in Taiwan.

References

Moths described in 1866
Chloephorinae